W. Edward Sell (1923 – August 15, 2004) was the Dean of the University of Pittsburgh School of Law from 1966 through 1977.

Education
He graduated from Washington & Jefferson College in 1945. He earned his J.D. from Yale Law School in 1947.

Tenure at University of Pittsburgh School of Law
He became a professor at University of Pittsburgh School of Law in 1947. As a professor, he received the "Excellence in Teaching Award" in 1986. He served as Chair of the Administrative Committee from 1965 through 1966.

Honors
Professor Douglas M. Branson is the current W. Edward Sell Professor of Business Law at the University of Pittsburgh School of Law
 
The University of Pittsburgh chapter of the American Inns of Court is named after Sell. He also the namesake of the American Inns of Court's "W. Edward Sell Inn Honors Professionalism Award."

Washington & Jefferson College awards the "W. Edward Sell Legal Achievement Award" annually at homecoming.

References 

20th-century American lawyers
Legal educators
Deans of law schools in the United States
Washington & Jefferson College alumni
Yale University alumni
University of Pittsburgh faculty
1923 births
2004 deaths
20th-century American academics